Etakkama, as a common name, but also, Aitukama, Atak(k)ama, Etak(k)ama, and Itak(k)ama is the name for the 'mayor' (king) of Qidšu, (Kadesh) of the 1350–1335 BC Amarna letters correspondence. (Qidšu is also referenced as: Qinšu, also Kissa). Etakkama is referenced in 11 of the 382 EA letters, (EA for 'el Amarna'), and especially, a series of 4 identical letters concerning: Amqu, the region of the Beqaa in Lebanon. Those 4 letters concern the intrigues of city/city-state takeovers, along with troops from Hatti, and the claim of: Etakkama's troops from 'Kinsa' -(Qidšu-Kissa)-Kadesh) and are titled: "A joint report on Amqu (1-4)".

Etakkama was the author of one letter, EA 189.

Letter no. 189, title: "Etakkama of Qadesh"
To the king, my lord: Message of Etakkama, your servant. I fall at the feet of my lord, my Sun, 7 times plus 7. My lord, I am your servant, but the wicked Biryawaza has gone on defaming me in your sight, my lord, and when he was defaming me in your sight, then he took my entire paternal estate along with the land of Qidšu, and sent my cities up in flames. But, I assure you, the commissioners of the king, my lord, and his magnates know my loyalty, since I said to the magnate Puhuru, "May the magnate Puhuru know that [...]" ...

Reverse
[...]
...Biryawaza. Thus do I serve you along w[it]h all my brothers, and wherever there is war against the king, I go, together with my troops, together with my chariots, and together with all my brothers. Since Biryawaza had allowed all of the cities of the king, my lord, to go over to the 'Apiru in Tahši and Upu, I went, and with your gods and your Sun leading me, I restored from the 'Apiru the cities to the king, my lord, for his service, and I disbanded the 'Apiru. May the king, my lord, rejoice at Etakkama, his servant, for I serve the king, my lord, together with all my brothers. I serve the king, my lord, but Biryawaza caused the loss of all [your] lan[ds. His intention] is solely injustice, but I am [your servant] forever. —EA 189, lines 1-20, Rev: lines 1-27 (bottom of tablet-letter damaged, lacuna of 2-5 sentences(?))

Besides claiming his loyalty to Pharaoh, Etakkama is revealing how Biryawaza, the King of Dimašqu, (Damascus) is really the problem in Upu, the region surrounding Damascus. The 'Amqu region' is the Beqaa Valley area to the northeast (of Damascus), in Lebanon.

See also
Biryawaza, mayor of Dimašqu/Damascus
Aram Damascus
Amqu; letter about Etakkama: "A joint report on Amqu (4)"
Upu

References
Moran, William L. The Amarna Letters. Johns Hopkins University Press, 1987, 1992. (softcover)

Amarna letters writers
Canaanite people
14th-century BC rulers
14th-century BC people